Sunbeam Television Corporation is a privately held broadcasting company based in Miami, Florida, that owns three television stations in the United States.

History

Sunbeam Television was formed on December 16, 1953, by Sidney Ansin, who inherited his family's shoemaking business in Massachusetts and later purchased South Florida real estate in the years after World War II, eventually settling in Miami Beach. Ansin's company was formed as one of five bidders for the channel 7 license in Miami, with sons Ronald and Edmund Ansin included as they had expressed interest in television themselves. While Biscayne Television Corporation, a three-way partnership between newspaper publishers James M. Cox and John S. Knight, along with former NBC president Niles Trammell, won the bidding process with the Federal Communications Commission (FCC) and signed on WCKT, their license was ultimately revoked after a combination of ethics violations within the FCC and improper conduct between the commissioners and Biscayne management. Sunbeam won a replacement license after it was determined that their bid was the only one amongst the original bidders conducted in an ethical manner, and purchased the assets of the former WCKT for their license, re-using the WCKT call sign.

Ed Ansin was installed as WCKT's executive vice president upon Sunbeam's takeover of the station. He became the company's president and chief operating officer after Sidney's death in October 1971. WCKT would change its call letters to WSVN in 1983 and would remain Sunbeam's lone property until 1993, when they acquired WHDH in Boston from New England Television.

On September 14, 2006, it was announced that Boston's WLVI would be acquired by Sunbeam from Tribune Broadcasting. The sale was approved in late November 2006, and Sunbeam took control of the station on December 18, 2006.

Following Ed Ansin's death in July 2020, ownership of Sunbeam Television was passed onto his sons Andrew and James; Andrew Ansin was appointed as the firm's president/CEO on August 3, 2020.

Stations

 † - As of January 9, 2018, channel shares on WHDH's spectrum.

Controversies

NBC affiliation disputes

WSVN
Sunbeam's flagship station, WCKT/WSVN in Miami, had been an NBC affiliate from the day it began operations in 1956. However, it suffered from poor viewership for its local news, and frequently pre-empted lower-rated network programming, much to NBC's chagrin. As NBC rose to ratings prominence during the middle 1980s, the network sought to upgrade its visibility in the growing Miami-Fort Lauderdale market.

In 1987, NBC's then-parent company General Electric purchased CBS affiliate WTVJ, the area's number one news station at the time, from investment firm Kohlberg Kravis Roberts & Co. Sunbeam immediately sought to block the purchase and spent over a year fighting NBC in court. As a result of the litigation, NBC was forced to run WTVJ as a CBS affiliate for over a year, which did not sit well with either network. Sunbeam's efforts were ultimately unsuccessful and on December 31, 1988, NBC ended its 32-year relationship with WCKT/WSVN and moved all its programming to WTVJ.

Not long after giving up on NBC, Sunbeam tried to acquire an affiliation with CBS, which was losing WTVJ to NBC after 40 years. CBS declined the offer, which left WSVN without a Big Three network affiliation. However, as a sidebar to the NBC purchase of WTVJ, CBS acquired Fox affiliate WCIX (now WFOR-TV) in the spring of 1988, despite its marginal signal in Fort Lauderdale and Broward County. This ended up leaving the young Fox network without a Miami outlet. WSVN and Fox soon agreed to an affiliation deal, initiating a partnership that began on January 1, 1989.

The Jay Leno Show
On April 2, 2009, WHDH in Boston announced that it would not join other NBC affiliates in airing a new hour-long program fronted by outgoing Tonight Show host Jay Leno. Instead, the station said it would simulcast an hour of local news at 10:00 P.M. with its sister station WLVI. In its statement, Sunbeam CEO Ed Ansin cited concerns with both ratings and advertising revenue for its existing 11:00 P.M. newscast as the main impetus for the decision. NBC answered Sunbeam with a threat to strip WHDH of its affiliation. WHDH had offered to air the new program at 11:00 as a compromise, but the network rejected that offer.

With the threats of lawsuits and the strong possibility of NBC making good on its promise, WHDH reconsidered its decision two weeks later. However, Ansin's foresight would later prove to be correct. Viewership for WHDH's 11:00 news dropped 20 percent in the November 2009 sweeps period, and a wave of affiliate complaints about similar declines for their late newscasts would force NBC to end the primetime run of the program on February 11, 2010 in a very controversial shake-up of its late night lineup.

Disaffiliating from WHDH
Nearly five years after the Jay Leno Show conflict, WHDH once again faced the prospect of losing its NBC affiliation as the network was seeking an owned-and-operated presence in Boston. In September 2015, NBC informed Sunbeam owner Ed Ansin that WHDH's affiliation would not be renewed, but then made an offer to buy the station for $200 million. Ansin balked at NBC's price stating that he would not consider any offers worth less than $500 million, and that any sale of WHDH would also include WLVI. Publicly, Ansin predicted that "we’re going to be the NBC affiliate", but also confirmed that NBC was planning to shift its programming to WNEU, a station based in Merrimack, New Hampshire owned by NBC sister network Telemundo. Ansin believed that NBCUniversal's main motivation for these moves was to create further synergies with WNEU and co-owned New England Cable News for the purposes of advertising sales. Initial reports suggested that if WHDH were to lose NBC programming, Sunbeam would move the CW affiliation currently held by WLVI to WHDH. However, Ansin later stated that WHDH would be operated as a news-intensive independent station if the NBC affiliation were lost; additionally, the possibility existed The CW's corporate co-parent, CBS, could transfer the CW affiliation to its owned duopoly station WSBK-TV in the fall of 2016, if WLVI were unable to renew its contract with the network.

On January 7, 2016, NBC Owned Television Stations president Valari Staab confirmed that NBC would cease its affiliation with WHDH effective January 1, 2017, and that it would launch its owned-and-operated NBC outlet on January 1, 2017. Staab did not outright say whether NBC programming will be carried by WNEU, but that NBCUniversal was evaluating options for over-the-air carriage of the new outlet. Prior to the announcement, Ansin told the Boston Globe that he was considering challenging the planned move of NBC from WHDH; he argued that the possible reduction in over-the-air coverage NBC may sustain if it moves to WNEU would constitute a violation of conditions imposed by the FCC upon Comcast's acquisition of NBC Universal, as it would not be in the public interest. His position was supported by U.S. Senator Edward Markey.

Ed Ansin tried to file a lawsuit against NBC on March 10, 2016 for violating antitrust law given to Comcast when it brought NBCUniversal and that WNEU's over-the-air signal only covers half of Eastern Massachusetts. His lawsuit, however, was closed off on May 16, 2016.

Ansin conceded his battle against NBCUniversal on August 16, 2016, and announced that WHDH would become an independent station at the start of 2017. WHDH planned to expand its newscasts in various dayparts, while counterprogramming the networks with syndicated offerings during primetime hours. Three months later in November, NBCUniversal made their plains formal: the company announced that NBC programming would move from WHDH to new O&O WBTS-LD, a low-power station acquired in September 2016. WBTS-LD would serve as the affiliate of record in Boston proper, and would also be simulcasted on the second digital subchannel of WNEU.

DirecTV carriage dispute
At midnight on January 14, 2012, Sunbeam shut down its link between its stations and the DirecTV satellite service after talks to increase the retransmission fees paid to the stations by a reported 300% failed. The effect of this dispute affected an estimated 230,000 customers in the South Florida area and interfered with the carriage of several NFL football games by local bars that subscribed to DirecTV during the outage. The dispute was resolved between Sunbeam and DirecTV with those local channels being restored to those affected customers at 6 pm on January 26.

References

External links
WSVN website
WHDH website
WLVI website

1962 establishments in Florida
Companies based in Miami
Mass media companies established in 1962
Television broadcasting companies of the United States